Christian missionaries arrived with Francis Xavier and the Jesuits in the 1540s and briefly flourished, with over 100,000 converts, including many daimyōs in Kyushu. It soon met resistance from the highest office holders of Japan. Emperor Ōgimachi issued edicts to ban Catholicism in 1565 and 1568, but to little effect. Beginning in 1587, with imperial regent Toyotomi Hideyoshi's ban on Jesuit missionaries, Christianity was repressed as a threat to national unity. After the Tokugawa shogunate banned Christianity in 1620 it ceased to exist publicly. Many Catholics went underground, becoming , while others lost their lives. Only after the Meiji Restoration was Christianity re-established in Japan.

Background
Portuguese shipping arrived in Japan in 1543, and Catholic missionary activities in Japan began in earnest around 1549, performed in the main by Portuguese-sponsored Jesuits until Spanish-sponsored Franciscans and Dominicans gained access to Japan. Of the 95 Jesuits who worked in Japan up to 1600, 57 were Portuguese, 20 were Spaniards and 18 Italian. Francisco Xavier, Cosme de Torres (a Jesuit priest) and Juan Fernandez were the first who arrived in Kagoshima with hopes to bring Catholicism to Japan.

The main goal was evangelism. But religion was also an integral part of the state and evangelization was seen as having both secular and spiritual benefits for both Portugal and Spain. Wherever these powers attempted to expand their territories or influence, missionaries would soon follow. By the Treaty of Tordesillas, the two powers divided the world between them into exclusive spheres of influence, trade and colonization. Although at the time of the demarcation, neither nation had any direct contact with Japan, that nation fell into the sphere of the Portuguese.

The countries disputed the attribution of Japan. Since neither could colonize it, the exclusive right to propagate Christianity in Japan meant the exclusive right to trade with Japan. Portuguese-sponsored Jesuits under Alessandro Valignano took the lead in proselytizing in Japan over the objection of the Spaniards. The fait accompli was approved in Pope Gregory XIII's papal bull of 1575, which decided that Japan belonged to the Portuguese diocese of Macau. In 1588, the diocese of Funai (the Funai Domain, centred on Nagasaki) was founded under Portuguese protection.

In rivalry with the Jesuits, Spanish-sponsored mendicant orders entered into Japan via Manila. While criticizing Jesuit activities, they actively lobbied the Pope. Their campaigns resulted in Pope Clement VIII's decree of 1600, which allowed Spanish friars to enter Japan via Portuguese India, and Pope Paul V's decree of 1608, which abolished the restrictions on the route. The Portuguese accused Spanish Jesuits of working for their homeland instead of their patron. The power struggle between Jesuits and mendicant orders caused a schism within the diocese of Funai. Furthermore, mendicant orders tried in vain to establish a diocese on the Tohoku region that was to be independent from the Portuguese one.

Religious rivalries between Catholics and Protestants reached Japan with the arrival of Dutch and English traders in the early 17th century. Although the English withdrew from their Japanese operations after a decade of trading under King James I due to lack of profitability, the Dutch continued to trade with Japan and became the only European country that maintained trade relations with Japan until the 19th century. Dutch traders frequently criticized the Catholic Church in Japan, which subsequently affected shogunate policies toward the kingdoms of Spain and Portugal.

Francis Xavier

Francis Xavier was the first Jesuit to go to Japan as a missionary.  In Portuguese Malacca in December 1547, Xavier met a Japanese man from Kagoshima named Anjirō. Anjirō had heard from Xavier in 1545 and had travelled from Kagoshima to Malacca with the purpose of meeting with him. Having been charged with murder, Anjirō had fled Japan. He told Xavier extensively about his former life and the customs and culture of his beloved homeland. Anjirō helped Xavier as a mediator and translator for the mission to Japan that now seemed much more possible. "I asked [Anjirō] whether the Japanese would become Christians if I went with him to this country, and he replied that they would not do so immediately, but would first ask me many questions and see what I knew. Above all, they would want to see whether my life corresponded with my teaching."

Xavier returned to India in January 1548. The next 15 months were occupied with various journeys and administrative measures in India. Then, due to displeasure at what he considered un-Christian life and manners on the part of the Portuguese which impeded missionary work, he left India and traveled to East Asia. He left Goa on 15 April 1549, stopped at Malacca and visited Canton. He was accompanied by Anjirō, two other Japanese men, the father Cosme de Torrès and Brother João Fernandes. He had taken with him presents for the "King of Japan" since he was intending to introduce himself as the Apostolic Nuncio.

Xavier reached Japan on 27 July 1549, with Anjirō and three other Jesuits, but it was not until 15 August that he went ashore at  Kagoshima, the principal port of the province of Satsuma on the island of Kyūshū. As a representative of the Portuguese king, he was received in a friendly manner and was hosted by Anjirō's family until October 1550. From October to December 1550, he resided in Yamaguchi. Shortly before Christmas, he left for Kyoto but failed to meet with the Emperor. He returned to Yamaguchi in March 1551, where he was permitted to preach by the daimyō of the province. However, lacking fluency in the Japanese language, he had to limit himself to reading aloud a Japanese translation of a catechism.

The Japanese people were not easily converted; many of the people were already Buddhist or Shinto. Francis tried to combat the disposition of some of the Japanese that a God who had created everything, including evil, could not be good. The concept of Hell was also a struggle; the Japanese were bothered by the idea of their ancestors living in Hell. Despite Francis' different religion, he felt that they were good people, and could be converted.

Xavier brought with him paintings of the Madonna and the Madonna and Child. These paintings were used to help teach the Japanese about Christianity. There was a huge language barrier as Japanese was unlike other languages the missionaries had previously encountered. For a long time Francis struggled to learn the language. Artwork continued to play a role in Francis’ teachings in Asia.

Xavier was welcomed by the Shingon monks since he used the word Dainichi for the Christian God; attempting to adapt the concept to local traditions. As Xavier learned more about the religious nuances of the word, he changed to Deusu from the Latin and Portuguese Deus. The monks later realized that Xavier was preaching a rival religion and grew more aggressive towards his attempts at conversion.

When Xavier arrived in Japan, the country was embroiled in a nationwide civil war. Neither the emperor nor the Ashikaga shōgun could exercise power over the nation. At first, Xavier planned to gain permission for building a mission from the emperor but was disappointed with the devastation of the imperial residence. The Jesuits approached daimyō in southwestern Japan and succeeded in converting some of them. One reason for their conversion may have been the Portuguese trade in which the Jesuits acted as brokers. The Jesuits recognized this and approached local rulers with offers of trade and exotic gifts.

The Jesuits believed that it was most effective to seek to influence people in power and to pass the religion downward to the commoners. At the least, they needed to gain permission from local rulers to propagate Catholicism within their domains. Indeed, as feudal lords converted to Catholicism, the number of believers within their territories also drastically increased. After the edict banning Christianity, there were communities that kept practicing Catholicism without any contact with the Church until missionaries were able to return much later.

When Xavier disembarked in Kagoshima, the principal chiefs of the two branches of the Shimazu family, Sanehisa and Katsuhisa, were warring for the sovereignty of their lands. Katsuhisa adopted Takahisa Shimazu, who in 1542 was accepted as head of the clan, having previously received the Portuguese merchants on Tanegashima Island and learned about the use of firearms. Later, he met Xavier himself at the castle of Uchiujijo and permitted the conversion of his vassals.

Having a religious background, Takahisa showed himself to be benevolent and already allowed freedom of worship, but did not help the missionaries or favor their church. Failing to find a way to the centre of affairs, the court of the Emperor, Xavier soon tired and left to Yamaguchi, thus beginning the Yamaguchi period. Xavier stayed in Yamaguchi for two months on his way to an abortive audience with the Emperor in Kyoto. Yamaguchi was a prosperous and refined city, and its leaders, the Ouchi family, were aware that Xavier's journey to Japan had begun after the completion of his mission in India.

They took Catholicism for some sort of new sect of Buddhism, and were curious to know of the priest's doctrine. Tolerant but shrewd, their eyes less on baptism than the Portuguese cargoes from Macau, they granted the Jesuit permission to preach. The uncompromising Xavier took to the streets of the city denouncing, among other things, infanticide, idolatry, and homosexuality (the last being widely accepted at the time). Misunderstandings were inevitable.

The Jesuits attempted to expand their activity to Kyoto and the surrounding regions. In 1559, Gaspar Vilela obtained permission from Ashikaga Yoshiteru to teach Christianity. This license was the same as those given to Buddhist temples, so special treatment cannot be confirmed regarding the Jesuits. On the other hand, Emperor Ōgimachi issued edicts to ban Catholicism in 1565 and 1568. The orders of the Emperor and the shōgun made little difference.

Christians refer positively to Oda Nobunaga, who died in the middle of the unification of Japan. He favored the Jesuit missionary Luís Fróis and generally tolerated Christianity. But overall, he undertook no remarkable policies toward Catholicism. Actually, Catholic power in his domain was trivial because he did not conquer western Japan, where the Jesuits were based.

With the passage of time, Xavier's sojourn in Japan could be considered somewhat fruitful as attested by congregations established in Hirado, Yamaguchi and Bungo. Xavier worked for more than two years in Japan and saw his successor-Jesuits established. He then decided to return to India.

For 45 years, the Jesuits were the only Christian missionaries in Asia, and then the Franciscans began proselytizing as well.

Propagation strategy
Christian books were published in Japanese from the 1590s on, some with more than one thousand copies and from 1601 a printing press was established under the supervision of Soin Goto Thomas, a citizen of Nagasaki with thirty Japanese working full-time at the press. Works such as the 'Feiqe Monogatari' were used to teach Portuguese speaking missionaries the Japanese language to propagate Christianity in Japan. Liturgical calendars were also printed after 1592 until at least 1634. Christian solidarity made also possible missionary mail delivery throughout the country until the end of the 1620s.

Early expansion

By 1579, at the height of missionary activity, there were about 130,000 converts.

By the end of the 16th century, the Japanese mission had become the largest overseas Christian community that was not under the rule of a European power. Since 1582, its uniqueness had been emphasized by Alessandro Valignano, who promoted a deeper accommodation of Japanese culture. Japan was then the sole overseas country in which all members of those confraternities were locals, as was the case with Christian missions in Mexico, Peru, Brazil, the Philippines, or India, in spite of the presence of a colonial elite.

The earliest success Christianity witnessed in Japan occurred in Kyushu. Conversions of local warlords like Ōmura Sumitada, Arima Yoshisada, and Ōtomo Sōrin led to the conversion of many of their subjects. The conversion of several elites in the area was likely due to the decentralized nature of the Sengoku period where warlords vied for control among themselves. This power vacuum led some warlords to believe that being more open to external sources of power and legitimacy as a possible method to gain an advantage.

As several daimyos and their subjects converted to Christianity, the destruction of Buddhist and Shinto temples and shrines would often accompany it, with the Jesuits also contributing to the destruction and persecutions. Buddhist monks and Shinto priests would face persecution by being forcefully evicted out of the temples which were then reused as Christian facilities. Some Christian daimyos also ordered the forced marriage of monks.

Most Japanese Christians lived in Kyushu, but Christianization was now a regional phenomenon and had a national impact. By the end of the 16th century it was possible to find baptized people in virtually every province of Japan, many of them organized in communities. On the eve of the Sekigahara battle, fifteen daimyōs were baptized, and their domains stretched from Hyuga in Southeast Kyushu to Dewa in North Honshū (see Costa 2003). Hundreds of churches had been built throughout Japan.

Accepted on a national scale, Christianity was also successful among different social groups from the poor to the rich, peasants, traders, sailors, warriors, or courtesans. Most of the daily activities of the Church were performed by Japanese from the beginning, giving the Japanese Church a native face, and this was one of the reasons for its success. By 1590, there were seventy native brothers in Japan, fully one half of Jesuits in Japan and fifteen percent of all Jesuits who were working in Asia.

The 1592 War between Japan and Korea also provided Westerners with a rare opportunity to visit Korea. Under orders of Gomaz, the Jesuit Gregorious de Cespedes arrived in Korea with a Japanese monk for the purposes of ministering to the Japanese troops. He stayed there for approximately 18 months, until April or May 1595, thus being on record as the first European missionary to visit the Korean peninsula but was unable to make any inroads. The 'Annual Letters of Japan' made a substantial contribution to the introduction of Korea to Europe, Francis Xavier having crossed paths with Korean envoys dispatched to Japan during 1550 and 1551.

The Japanese missions were economically self-sufficient. Nagasaki's misericórdias became rich and powerful institutions which every year received large donations. The brotherhood grew in numbers to over 100 by 1585 and 150 in 1609. Controlled by the elite of Nagasaki, and not by Portuguese, it had two hospitals (one for lepers) and a large church. By 1606, there already existed a feminine religious order called Miyako no Bikuni (Nuns of Kyoto) which accepted Korean converts such as Marina Pak, baptized in Nagasaki. Nagasaki was called “the Rome of Japan” and most of its inhabitants were Christians. By 1611, it had ten churches and was divided into eight parishes, including a specifically Korean order.

Nature of early Christian community

Different groups of laymen supported Christian life in Japanese mission, e.g., dōjuku (同宿), kanbō (看防), and jihiyakusha helped the clergymen in activities like the celebration of Sunday liturgy in the absence of ordained clergy, religious education, preparation of confessions, and spiritual support of the sick. By the end of the 16th century kanbō and jihiyakusha had similar responsibilities and also organized funerals and baptized children with permission to baptize from Rome. The kanbō were those who had left secular life but not taken formal vows, while the jihiyakusha were married and had a profession.

These groups were fundamental to the mission, and depended on both the ecclesiastical hierarchy as well as the warlords who controlled the lands where they lived. Therefore, the success of the Japanese mission cannot be explained only as the result of the action of the missionaries or of the commercial and political interests of a few daimyōs and traders.

Economic activities
The Jesuits in Japan had to maintain economic self-sufficiency because they could not expect stable and sufficient payment from their patron, the King of Portugal, the king allowing the Jesuits to engage in trade with Japan. Such economic activity can be found in the work of Francis Xavier, the pioneer of Catholic missions in Japan, who covered the cost of missionary work through merchant trading. From the 1550s to the 1570s, the Jesuits covered all necessary expenses with trade profits and bought land in India.

Their officially recognized commercial activity was a fixed-amount entry into the Portuguese silk trade between Macau and Nagasaki. They financed to a certain amount the trade association in Macau, which purchased raw silk in Canton and sold it in Nagasaki. They did not confine their commercial activity to the official silk market but expanded into unauthorized markets. For the Macau-Nagasaki trade, they dealt in silk fabrics, gold, musk and other goods including military supplies and slavery. Sometimes, they even got involved in Spanish trade, prohibited by the kings of Spain and Portugal, and antagonized the Portuguese traders.

It was mainly procurators who brokered Portuguese trade. They resided in Macau and Nagasaki, and accepted purchase commitments by Japanese customers such as the shogunate daimyōs and wealthy merchants. By brokerage, the Jesuits could expect not only rebates but also favorable treatment from the authorities. For this reason, the office of procurator became an important post among the Jesuits in Japan. Although trade activities by the Jesuits ate into Portuguese trade interests, procurators continued their brokerage utilizing the authority of the Catholic Church. At the same time, Portuguese merchants required the assistance of procurators who were familiar with Japanese customs, since they established no permanent trading post in Japan. Probably the most notable procurator was João Rodrigues, who approached Toyotomi Hideyoshi and Tokugawa Ieyasu and even participated in the administration of Nagasaki.

Such commercial activities were contrary to the idea of honorable poverty that the priests held. But some Jesuits at this time placed the expansion of the society's influence before this ideal. Mendicant orders fiercely accused the Jesuits of being corrupt and even considered their activity as the primary reason for Japan's ban on Catholicism. Mendicant orders themselves were not necessarily uninvolved in commercial activities.

João Rodrigues  was a Jesuit missionary who became a fluent interpreter of Japanese life to the West. At age 16 he was assigned to the Jesuit Mission in Nagasaki in 1577 in a period of military and civil strife. He gained an unmatched fluency in speaking Japanese and was a lead interpreter in high level negotiations, as with Hideyoshi. He compiled essential reference books including a Japanese grammar, Japanese-Portuguese dictionary with interpretative sections on Japanese life and culture, a history of the mission, and an introduction to Japanese culture.  As treasurer of the mission he handled business and worked with Portuguese shippers.

Military activities

Many daimyōs converted to Christianity to gain more favorable access to saltpeter, used to make gunpowder. Between 1553 and 1620, 86 daimyōs were officially baptized, and many more were sympathetic to the Christians.

The Jesuits provided various kinds of support including military support to Kirishitan daimyōs when they were threatened by non-Kirishitan daimyōs. Most notable was their support of Omura Sumitada and Arima Harunobu, who fought against the anti-Catholic Ryuzoji clan.

Ōtomo Sorin was a famous Christian daimyo, he fought alongside Portugueses in the Siege of Moji. Ōtomo maintained an alliance with Christian Europeans throughout his military career. His wife, known to the Jesuits as Ōtomo-Nata Jezebel, was one of the precursors against Christianity. He later had to divorce her and declare war against Usa Hachimangū in which Jezebel was a priestess.

In the 1580s, Valignano believed in the effectiveness of military action and fortified Nagasaki and Mogi. In 1585, Gaspar Coelho asked the Spanish Philippines to send a fleet but the plan was rejected due to the shortness of its military capability.   Christians Protasio Arima and Paulo Okamoto were named as principals in an assassination plot to murder the magistrate in charge of the shogunate's most important port city of Nagasaki.

Toyotomi Hideyoshi
The situation was changed when Toyotomi Hideyoshi reunified Japan. Hideyoshi first allowed Christianity since he believed it to be a matter of individual belief. Later, Hideyoshi began to pay more attention to external threats, particularly the expansion of European power in East Asia. In 1587, while trying to establish control of his new kingdom in some parts of Kyushu, he encountered Buddhist temples that had been sacked by Catholic forces attempting to convert the entire island by force. This attempted purge of Buddhism from Kyushu had begun years earlier, in 1562, with the conversion of Omura Sumitada, Japan's first Roman Catholic daimyo, who began a scorched earth campaign against local Buddhists and their places of worship, despite Jesuits advising him to not destroy Shinto and Buddhist temples. This added to Hideyoshi's suspicion of the religion.

Hideyoshi's questions to missionaries included:

 Why are you so enthusiastic about making Japanese people Christian? 
 Why do you destroy shrines and temples, persecute the priests, and not try to reconcile with them? 
 Why do you eat cows and horses even though they are beneficial animals for humans? 
 Why do Portuguese buy so many Japanese and take them abroad as slaves?

The turning point for Catholic missions was the San Felipe incident in 1596, where, in an attempt to recover his cargo, the Spanish captain of a shipwrecked trading vessel claimed that the missionaries were there to prepare Japan for conquest. These claims deepened Hideyoshi's suspicions of the foreign religion. From then on, he attempted to curb Catholicism while also maintaining good trading relations with Portugal and Spain, who may have provided military support to Dom Justo Takayama, a Christian daimyō in western Japan.

Persecution and martyrdom

By 1587, Toyotomi Hideyoshi had become alarmed, not because of too many converts but rather because the hegemon learned that the Jesuits reportedly oversaw forced conversions of retainers and commoners, that they had garrisoned the city of Nagasaki, that they participated in the slave trade of other Japanese and, apparently offending Hideyoshi's Buddhist sentiments, that they allowed the slaughter of horses and oxen for food. He was concerned that divided loyalties might lead to dangerous rebels like the Ikkō-ikki Sect of earlier years and produced his edict expelling missionaries. However, this decree was not particularly enforced.

Toyotomi Hideyoshi promulgated a ban on Christianity in form of the "Bateren-tsuiho-rei" (the Purge Directive Order to the Jesuits) on July 24, 1587. Hideyoshi put Nagasaki under his direct rule to control Portuguese trade.

When Toyotomi Hideyoshi issued the Bateren-tsuiho-rei, the Jesuits in Japan, led by Coelho, planned armed resistance. At first, they sought help from Kirishitan daimyōs but the daimyōs refused. Then they called for a deployment of reinforcements from their homeland and its colonies. But this plan was vetoed by Valignano. Like the Kirishitan daimyōs, he realized that a military campaign against Japan's powerful ruler would bring catastrophe to Catholicism in Japan. Valignano survived the crisis by laying all the blame on Coelho. In 1590, the Jesuits decided to stop intervening in the struggles between the daimyōs and to disarm themselves, however, they continued to send secret shipments of food and financial aid to Kirishitan daimyōs.

On February 5, 1597, twenty-six Christians – six Franciscan missionaries, three Japanese Jesuits and seventeen Japanese laymen including three young boys – were executed by crucifixion in Nagasaki. These individuals were raised on crosses and then pierced through with spears. The Martyrs of Japan were canonized on June 8, 1862 by Blessed Pius IX, and are listed on the calendar as Sts. Paul Miki and his Companions, commemorated on February 6, February 5, the date of their death, being the feast of Saint Agatha.

Persecution continued sporadically, breaking out again in 1613 and 1630. On September 10, 1632, 55 Christians were martyred in Nagasaki in what became known as the Great Genna Martyrdom. At this time, Catholicism was officially outlawed. The Church, without a clergy, went underground until the arrival of Western missionaries in the 19th century.

Tokugawa Ieyasu

After Toyotomi Hideyoshi's death, Tokugawa Ieyasu assumed power over Japan, in 1600. Like Toyotomi Hideyoshi, he disliked Christian activities in Japan but gave priority to trade with Portugal and Spain. He secured Portuguese trade in 1600. He negotiated with Manila to establish trade with the Philippines. The trade promotion made his policies toward Catholicism inconsistent. At the same time, in an attempt to wrest control of the Japan trade from the Catholic countries, Dutch and English traders advised the shogunate that Spain did indeed have territorial ambitions, and that Catholicism was Spain's principal means. In contrast, the Dutch and English promised that they would limit themselves to trading and would not conduct missionary activities in Japan.

Following Toyotomi's death in 1598, it seems that the Jesuits realized that the Tokugawa shogunate was much stronger and more stable than Toyotomi Hideyoshi's administration, yet the mendicant orders relatively openly discussed military options. The Jesuits and the Mendicant Orders kept a lasting rivalry over the Japanese mission and attached to different imperial strategies.

The Tokugawa shogunate finally decided to ban Catholicism in 1614, and in the mid-17th century demanded the expulsion of all European missionaries and the execution of all converts. This marked the end of open Christianity in Japan. 
The immediate cause of the prohibition was the Okamoto Daihachi incident, a case of fraud involving Ieyasu's Catholic vavasor, but there were also other reasons behind it. The shogunate was concerned about a possible invasion by the Iberian colonial powers, which had previously occurred in the New World and the Philippines. In 1615, a Franciscan emissary of the Viceroy of New Spain asked the shōgun for land to build a Spanish fortress and this deepened Japan's suspicion against Catholicism and the  Iberian colonial powers behind it. Domestically, the ban was closely related to measures against the Toyotomi clan. The statement on the "Expulsion of all missionaries from Japan", drafted by Zen monk Konchiin Suden (1563–1633) and issued in 1614 under the name of second Tokugawa shōgun Hidetada (ruled 1605–1623), was considered the first official statement of a comprehensive control of Kirishitan. It claimed that the Christians were bringing disorder to Japanese society and that their followers "contravene governmental regulations, traduce Shinto, calumniate the True Law, destroy regulations, and corrupt goodness".  It was fully implemented and canonized as one of the fundamental Tokugawan laws.

The systematic persecution beginning in 1614 faced stiff resistance from Christians, despite the departure of more than half the clergy. Once again, the main reason for this resistance was not the presence of a few priests but rather the self-organization of many communities. Forced to secrecy, and having a small number of clergymen working underground, the Japanese Church was able to recruit leadership from among lay members. Japanese children seem to have participated actively in the resistance, sparking admiration among the Portuguese. Nagasaki remained a Christian city in the first decades of the 17th century, and during the general persecutions other confraternities were founded in Shimabara, Kinai and Franciscans in Edo.

The Buddhist ecclesiastical establishment was made responsible for verifying that a person was not a Christian through what became known as the "temple guarantee system" (terauke seido). By the 1630s, people were being required to produce a certificate of affiliation with a Buddhist temple as proof of religious orthodoxy, social acceptability, and loyalty to the regime.

The number of active Christians is estimated to have been around 200,000 in 1582. Christians attach a great theological importance to martyrdom, and in Japan, there were around 1,000 known martyrs during the missionary period. Countless others were dispossessed of their land and property, leading to their subsequent death in poverty.

The Japanese government used Fumi-e, pictures of the Virgin Mary and Christ meant to be trod upon, to reveal practicing Catholics and sympathizers. Anyone reluctant to step on the pictures was identified as Catholic and sent to Nagasaki. The policy of the Japanese government (Edo) was to turn Christians from their faith; if the Catholics refused to renounce their religion, they were tortured. Those who would not recant were typically executed on Nagasaki's Mount Unzen. The prosecution lasted for over 2 centuries.

The Shimabara Rebellion, led by a young Christian boy named Amakusa Shirō Tokisada, took place in 1637. The Rebellion was sparked by economic desperation and government oppression, but later assumed a religious tone. About 27,000 people joined the uprising, but it was crushed by the shogunate after a sustained campaign. They are not considered martyrs by the Catholic Church since they took up arms for materialistic reasons. Many Japanese were deported to Macau or to the Spanish Philippines. Many Macanese and Japanese Mestizos are the mixed-race descendants of the deported Japanese Catholics. Four hundred people were officially deported by the government to Macau and Manila, but thousands of Japanese were pressured into moving voluntarily. About 10,000 Macanese and 3,000 Japanese were moved to Manila.

Kakure Kirishitan

The Catholic remnant in Japan were driven underground and its members became known as the "Hidden Christians". Some priests remained in Japan illegally, including eighteen Jesuits, seven Franciscans, seven Dominicans, one Augustinian, five seculars and an unknown number of Jesuit irmao and dojuku. During the Edo period, the Kakure Kirishitans kept their faith. Biblical phrases or prayers were transferred orally from parent to child, and secret posts (Mizukata) were assigned in their underground community to baptize their children, all while regional governments continuously operated Fumie to expose Christians. Drawn from the oral histories of Japanese Catholic communities, Shusaku Endo's acclaimed novel "Silence" provides detailed accounts of the persecution of Christian communities and the suppression of the Church.

Kakure Kirishitans are called the "hidden" Christians because they continued to practice Christianity in secret. They worshipped in secret rooms in private homes. As time went on, the figures of the saints and the Virgin Mary were transformed into figurines that looked like the traditional statues of the Buddha and bodhisattvas. The prayers were adapted to sound like Buddhist chant, yet retained many untranslated words from Latin, Portuguese and Spanish. The Bible was passed down orally, due to fears of printed works being confiscated by authorities. Because of the expulsion of the Catholic clergy in the 17th century, the Kakure Christian community relied on lay leaders to lead the services.

In some cases, the communities drifted away from Christian teachings. They lost the meaning of the prayers and their religion became a version of the cult of ancestors, in which the ancestors happened to be their Christian martyrs.

Many secret Christians, some of whom had adopted these new ways of practicing Christianity, came out of hiding when religious freedom was re-established in the mid-19th century and rejoined the Roman Catholic Church after renouncing their unorthodox, syncretic practices. However, there were those who decided not to rejoin. They are known as the Hanare Kirishitan (separated Christians).

Modern extinction of Hanare Kirishitans

Following the legalization of Christianity and secularization of Japan, many Hanare Kirishitan lineages ended abruptly. Traditionally, boys learned the rituals and prayers from their fathers; when boys were uninterested or moved away from the homes, there would be no one left to continue the lineage.

For a while, Hanare Kirishitans were thought to have died out entirely, due to their tradition of secrecy. A group on Ikitsuki Island in Nagasaki prefecture, which had been overlooked by the Japanese government during the time of persecution, made their practices public in the 1980s and now perform them for audiences; however, these practices have acquired some attributes of theater, such as the telling of folktales and the use of statues and other images which most underground Christians had never created.

The anthropologist Christal Whelan uncovered the existence of genuine Hanare Kirishitans on the Gotō Islands where Kakure Kirishitans had once fled. There were only two surviving priests on the islands, both of whom were over 90, and they would not talk to each other. The few surviving laity had also all reached old age, and some of them no longer had any priests from their lineage and prayed alone. Although these Hanare Kirishitans had a strong tradition of secrecy, they agreed to be filmed for her documentary Otaiya.

Rediscovery and return

Japan was opened to foreign interaction by Matthew Perry in 1853. It became possible for foreigners to live in Japan with the Harris Treaty in 1858. Many Christian clergymen were sent from Catholic, Protestant and Orthodox Churches, though proselytizing was still banned. In 1865, some of the Japanese who lived in Urakami village near Nagasaki visited the new Ōura Church which had been built by the Paris Foreign Missions Society (Missions étrangères de Paris) barely a month before. A female member of the group spoke to a French priest, Bernard Thaddée Petitjean, and revealed that their families had kept the Kirishitan faith. Those Kirishitan wanted to see the statue of the Virgin Mary with their own eyes, and to confirm that the priest was single and truly came from the Pope in Rome. After this interview, many Kirishitan thronged toward Petitjean. He investigated their underground organizations and discovered that they had kept the rite of baptism and the liturgical years without European priests for nearly 250 years. Petitjean's report surprised the Christian world; Pope Pius IX called it a miracle.

The Edo shogunate's edicts banning Christianity were still on the books, however, and thus the religion continued to be persecuted up to 1867, the last year of its rule. Robert Bruce Van Valkenburgh, the American minister-resident in Japan, privately complained of this persecution to the Nagasaki magistrates, though little action was taken to stop it. The succeeding Meiji government initially continued in this vein and several thousand people were exiled (Urakami Yoban Kuzure). After Europe and the U.S. began to vocally criticize the persecution, the Japanese government realized that it needed to lift the ban in order to attain its interests. In 1873 the ban was lifted. Numerous exiles returned and began construction of the Urakami Cathedral, which was completed in 1895.

It was later revealed that tens of thousands of Kirishitan still survived in some regions near Nagasaki. Some officially returned to the Catholic Church, while others remained apart from the Catholic Church and have stayed as Hanare Kirishitan, retaining their own traditional beliefs and their descendants asserting that they keep their ancestors' religion. However, it became difficult for them to keep their community and rituals, so they have converted to Buddhism or Shinto eventually. When Pope John Paul II visited Nagasaki in 1981, he baptized some young people from Kakure Kirishitan families – a rare occurrence.

See also

Kakure Kirishitan ("hidden Christian"), a phrase referring to the Japanese communities that continued to practice a native form of Christianity secretly in spite of persecution. Their isolation led to their drifting away from the foreign version of the religion.
Martyrs of Japan
Omura Sumitada, Japan's first Roman Catholic daimyo
Nanban trade period
Nippo jisho
Roman Catholicism in Japan
Silence, Shusaku Endo's novel about the 17th-century suppression of the last known Japanese Christian communities.
Suwa Shrine (Nagasaki)
 List of Westerners who visited Japan before 1868

Notes

References
 Ellisonas, Jurgis. "Christianity and the daimyo", in John Whitney Hall, ed. The Cambridge History of Japan: Early modern Japan (1991) pp 301–371
 Elison, George. Deus Destroyed: The Image of Christianity in Early Modern Japan (1988)
 
 Joseph, Kenny. "Over 20,000 Assyrian Missionaries ... Came to Japan in 199 A.D.", Christian News, vol. 34, no. 26 (24 June 1996), p. 23. Discusses the first evangelization of Japan by Assyrian (Chaldean) Christian missionaries from Mesopotamia (historic Kurdistan) near the beginning of the 3rd century, thus long before the first Roman Catholic mission work there.
 
 
 
 
 
 
 
 
 C. R. Boxer & J. S. Cummins, The Dominican mission in Japan (1602–1622), 1963
 Boxer, C. R. The Christian Century in Japan. 3rd edition. Manchester: Carcanet, 1993.
 Murai Shōsuke y “Tanegashima: The Arrival of Europe in Japan”. Bulletin of Portuguese/Japanese Studies 8: 93–106 2004.
 Fujita, Neil. Japan’s Encounter with Christianity: The Catholic Mission in Pre-modern Japan New York: Paulist Press 1991.

External links

 History of Catholic Church in Japan, Catholic Bishops’ Conference of Japan
Feiqe no Monogatari

History of Christianity in Japan
History of Catholicism in Asia
Catholic Church in Japan
Japan

de:Christentum in Japan#Römisch-Katholische Kirche in Japan
it:Chiesa cattolica in Giappone#Storia